The Luhansk Regional Committee of the Communist Party of Ukraine, commonly referred to as the Luhansk CPU obkom, was the position of highest authority in the Luhansk Oblast (until March 5, 1958 and again from January 5, 1970 until May 4, 1990 as the Voroshylovhrad Oblast), in the Ukrainian SSR of the Soviet Union. The position was created in June 1938, and abolished in August 1991. The First Secretary was a de facto appointed position usually by the Central Committee of the Communist Party of Ukraine or the First Secretary of the Communist Party of Ukraine.

List of First Secretaries of the Communist Party of Luhansk

See also
Luhansk Oblast

Notes

Sources
 World Statesmen.org

Regional Committees of the Communist Party of Ukraine (Soviet Union)
Ukrainian Soviet Socialist Republic
History of Luhansk Oblast
1938 establishments in the Soviet Union
1991 disestablishments in the Soviet Union